or simply known as , real name Mathias Cronqvist, is a fictional character from the Castlevania video game series. A vampire and a sorcerer, he is the main antagonist of the series and the final boss of almost every installment. He is the overall protagonist in the rebooted Castlevania trilogy Lords of Shadow—though he takes on his classical antagonistic role in the game Mirror of Fate—where his origin is heavily altered, as he is reimagined as being part of a holy order who eventually falls from grace and becomes the vampire Dracula, making him the king and ruler of darkness.

The Dracula of Castlevania is based on Bram Stoker's character in the novel of the same name, who was in turn likely named for Vlad III Dracula of Wallachia. The Castlevania Dracula draws some history from both, but instead of only preying on maidens, this version threatens whole realms with his armies at the least, and at worst is presented as the very embodiment of evil. He is, however, capable of loving relationships (his evil nature is partly fuelled by the loss of two women he loved) and, despite their differences, he loves his son Alucard.

In the series reboot Castlevania: Lords of Shadow, Dracula is reimagined as an 11th-century holy knight named Gabriel Belmont and serves as the central character of the game and its two sequels. The Lords of Shadow series tells the story of Gabriel's quest to save the world, fall into darkness, and journey of redemption.

Conception and design
Dracula's appearance is inconsistent throughout the series' history. His face resembles that of Bela Lugosi's Dracula in the first few games and in Castlevania: Portrait of Ruin. In Castlevania: Rondo of Blood and the beginning of Castlevania: Symphony of the Night, he resembles an anime character with medium length, purple hair. He has a more demonic look in Castlevania: Dracula X and Castlevania: Bloodlines. Symphony of the Night gives him a beard or goatee and longer hair. His hair color changes between a dark brown or black and gray color. He has a very heavyset and muscular looking face in the Nintendo 64 Castlevania games, whereas he has a more thin and elegant face in Symphony of the Night and the first two handheld games. In Castlevania: Curse of Darkness, Dracula wears a long robe, with a more realistic version of the Symphony of the Night face. In just about every game, he wears very aristocratic clothing, whether it be a tuxedo or royal garb (complete with medals and medallions). While his bio in Castlevania Judgement states he's ,  Dracula has no definitive height. Regardless of his appearance, Dracula is almost always twice as tall as his opponents in his more "human" form which usually requires the player to jump in order to hit him.

His most common form of attack is to teleport from one part of the screen to another, then open his cape to fire a spread of three fireballs at the player. In later games he can also fire larger, meteor-like fireballs: these attacks are called "HellFire" and "Dark Inferno" respectively. Usually, he can only be damaged with strikes to the head or neck area. After being defeated in his humanoid form, Dracula usually morphs into a larger, more powerful demon-like dragon or dinosaur form. In some games, such as Castlevania: The Dracula X Chronicles, Dracula consists of three forms in total. This is in contrast to Castlevania: Order of Ecclesia, where he only has one form. This battle with Dracula does feature multiple phases of combat, however: in the first phase, he acts as described above yet shoots a barrage of fireballs for Hellfire and has a new attack called "Fatal Ray", which he performs after he uses Dark Inferno. With this attack, he shoots beams of dark energy into the air which cascade down shortly afterward. If playing as Shanoa, the battle enters the third phase when the second is completed: here he cannot be damaged and a certain Glyph Union must be performed before he unleashes "Giga Demonic Megiddo", which can easily kill Shanoa with one blast (a weaker version of this attack features in Portrait of Ruin, during the Dracula and Death stage of the battle).

For the Lords of Shadow series, in which Dracula is playable, his design was influenced by Robert Carlyle. Carlyle complimented Dave Cox's work while Cox said that thanks to Carlyle's own work, Gabriel's design was changed more. Producer Dave Cox used Tony Soprano from the television drama The Sopranos as an example in regards to Dracula's characterization. By Lords of Shadow 2, Dracula starts questioning his actions. Kojima's input included advising Cox's team to redesign some of the lead character, Gabriel, who he felt needed a "more heroic face". Originally, Gabriel's design resembled a classic barbarian, before Kojima then advised the staff to refine him into a character that was more relatable for the player. Cox mentioned that the voice acting provided by Robert Carlyle helped humanize Gabriel's character.

Appearances
Dracula first appeared in 1986's Castlevania, set in 1691. At this point the plot of the series was very simple – Simon Belmont takes up his ancestral weapon, the Vampire Killer whip, and ventures into Dracula's castle to defeat its proprietor. The original game has no in-game text to drive the story along. The plot of Castlevania was re-used in the remakes Vampire Killer, Haunted Castle, Super Castlevania IV and Castlevania Chronicles.

In the manual of the second game, Castlevania II: Simon's Quest, it is revealed that, in his dying moments at the end of the first game, Dracula placed a curse on Simon, which condemned him to slowly die of his wounds. In 1698, Simon sets out to gather Dracula's scattered body parts and use them to resurrect the Count in the ruins of his castle. Simon then defeats the reborn Dracula. The best ending hints that although Simon defeats Dracula and dispels his curse, Dracula nonetheless revives himself. The 2 other endings in the game reveal that Simon died as a result of the final confrontation(this result happens if you take more than 7 days during the game to defeat Dracula).

Castlevania III: Dracula's Curse is a prequel to the original game, starring Simon's ancestor Trevor in 1476. This game introduced Alucard, Dracula's estranged son. In Dracula's Curse, it is stated that Dracula "practiced sorcery in order to create a bad world filled with evil". The people of Transylvania secure the aid of Trevor Belmont, who journeys to Castlevania and meets up with several allies along the way, including Alucard, Sypha Belnades and Grant Danasty.

In Castlevania: The Adventure, set in 1576, Christopher Belmont defeats Dracula. It is later revealed that Dracula escaped and survived until 1591, when he kidnapped Christopher's son Soleiyu and tried to turn him against his father. In Castlevania II: Belmont's Revenge, Christopher defeats Dracula again and saves his son.

Castlevania: Rondo of Blood takes place in 1792 and stars a new Belmont named Richter. This was the first game in the series to use substantial voice acting to further the narrative. Dracula is resurrected by a cult led by a dark priest named Shaft. He proceeds to kidnap several villagers including Richter's girlfriend Annette (who was renamed to Annet Renard in Castlevania: Dracula X and became Maria's sister) and Maria Renard. In the "best" ending of the game, Richter saves all the kidnapped women and defeats Dracula.

The protagonist of Castlevania: Symphony of the Night is Alucard, who enters Castlevania in 1797 following the disappearance of Richter. Symphony of the Night introduced the character of Lisa, Alucard's mother and Dracula's wife who had been executed as a witch for preparing medicine to help the sick. Alucard discovers that Shaft had placed Richter under a dark spell, the idea being that Richter would destroy all other enemies of Dracula. Alucard defeats Shaft, then faces his resurrected father. They exchange words before Alucard defeats Dracula, telling him Lisa's last words: "Do not hate humans. If you cannot live with them, then at least do them no harm, for theirs is already a hard lot". Dracula cries out for Lisa's forgiveness as he returns to the abyss.

In Castlevania Legends, a loose prequel to Symphony of the Night, Sonia Belmont, heavily implied to be Trevor's mother, faces Dracula circa 1450. Alucard is also featured in the game, and it appears that Sonia and Alucard were lovers. Series producer Koji Igarashi, who was not involved with Legends''' development, has declared it to not be part of the Castlevania canon.Castlevania: Bloodlines (known as Castlevania: The New Generation in Europe and Australia) is set in 1917 and attempted to tie the series closer to Bram Stoker's novel. The protagonists are John Morris and Eric Lecarde. John was intended to be the son of Quincey Morris from the novel. This game introduced Dracula's niece, Elizabeth Bartley, named for Elizabeth Báthory. It was implied that Bartley arranged the assassination of Archduke Franz Ferdinand of Austria in order to precipitate World War I. She resurrects Dracula, but she and her uncle are defeated by John and Eric.

The 1999 Castlevania and Castlevania: Legacy of Darkness take place in the mid-19th century. In these games, Dracula's return is accomplished through the unusual method of having him reincarnated as a child named Malus.

Set in the early 1800s, Castlevania: Circle of the Moon explains how Dracula was defeated by vampire hunter Morris Baldwin. At the start of the game, Dracula is resurrected by his disciple Camilla. The player assumes the role of Nathan Graves, a student of Morris Baldwin, who once again defeats the newly resurrected Dracula.Castlevania: Harmony of Dissonance takes place in 1748. Simon's grandson Juste is the main character. He enters Castlevania to save his childhood friend Lydie Erlanger. Their friend Maxim Kischine resurrected Dracula in order to prove his worth as a vampire hunter. Dracula is defeated by Juste.Castlevania: Aria of Sorrow features a deeper plot than the previous two. Set in 2035, the game stars Soma Cruz, a high school exchange student visiting Japan with his friend Mina. The villain of this game is not Dracula, as he died a real death over 30 years ago, but Graham Jones, a cult leader who believes himself to be Dracula's reincarnation. The game also introduced the amnesiac Julius Belmont, who defeated Dracula for the last time in 1999. It is revealed that Soma himself is actually Dracula's reincarnation, and possesses the Count's power to absorb the souls of various monsters and thereby assume their powers.

The prequel Castlevania: Lament of Innocence takes place in 1094. The game introduced Crusaders Leon Belmont and Mathias Cronqvist. In 1093, they returned from a campaign to find that Mathias' wife Elisabetha had died. A year later, Leon's fiancée Sara disappears. Mathias tells Leon that she was kidnapped by a vampire named Walter Bernhard, who lives in a castle in the Forest of Eternal Night. Leon forsakes his title and arms in order to venture into the castle and save Sara. He is given a weapon known as the Whip of Alchemy. Leon eventually rescues Sara, but she is already infected with the vampire's curse. She sacrifices her soul to imbue the Whip of Alchemy with the power to destroy Walter. Leon returns to the castle and defeats Walter. Mathias then appears and reveals that he orchestrated the entire scheme in order to gain possession of the Crimson Stone. Mathias blamed God for Elisabetha's death, and plans to revenge himself upon God by becoming immortal. He offers Leon the chance to join him in eternal life. Leon refuses. Disappointed, Mathias escapes, leaving Leon to battle Death. Series producer Koji Igarashi has confirmed that Mathias eventually becomes Dracula.Castlevania: Curse of Darkness is a sequel to Castlevania III, taking place in 1479. The main character is Hector, a "Devil Forgemaster" who served Dracula but left his service just prior to his defeat at the hands of Trevor. With his dying words, Dracula places a curse upon the land. Hector plans to live peacefully amongst humans, but his wife Rosalie is executed for witchcraft at the behest of fellow Forgemaster Isaac. Hector swears revenge upon Isaac, but this is a ploy; Isaac intends to use Hector as the vessel for Dracula's return. Hector defeats Isaac, who himself becomes the vessel. Hector then faces Dracula, defeats him, and used his powers to dispel the curse.Castlevania: Dawn of Sorrow is a sequel to Aria of Sorrow and once again stars Soma Cruz. This time, Soma faces a cult led by Celia Fortner who wish to resurrect Dracula in order to bring about the arrival of the ultimate good to balance the ultimate evil. In the "bad" ending of the game, Soma succumbs to Dracula's power and kills Celia in cold blood: this unlocks a non-canon storyline called "Julius Mode" in which Julius ventures through the castle and defeats Soma. If Soma equips Mina's talisman beforehand, he resists the transformation (and is snapped out of it by Arikado), but his power of dominance is copied by Dmitri Blinov, one of Celia's accomplices, and he and Celia escape underground. Celia still dies, however: Dmitri sacrifices her to corrupt Arikado's power and render him unable to fight. Dmitri attempts to become the new Dracula like Graham before him so he may understand his power, but he loses control of the power of dominance and is consumed by it. This transforms him into a gargantuan creature called Menace, which Soma vanquishes. This results in the "good" ending, in which Soma is reassured that even if there is a need for a dark lord, it does not need to be him.Castlevania: Portrait of Ruin is a sequel to Bloodlines. The player takes control of Jonathan Morris, John Morris' son, and Charlotte Aulin. In this game, Dracula's castle is resurrected by vampire artist Brauner during World War II. At the end of this game, Dracula takes the unusual step of fighting alongside Death, before fusing with Death and morphing into a final, demonic form.Castlevania: Order of Ecclesia is set around 1800 and features a holy order named Ecclesia which had apparently created a power named Dominus with the ability to defeat Dracula. However, Dominus is actually constructed from Dracula's own power, and the Order made Dominus to break the seal on the casket imprisoning his soul, as their leader Barlowe believed Dracula's return was secretly mankind's greatest desire. Ecclesia's chief researcher Albus had stolen the Dominus glyph in an attempt to protect the main character, Shanoa, who had been raised as his younger sister, but became possessed by Dracula when he absorbed one part of the glyph. After Dracula's resurrection, Shanoa faces and defeats him.

Lords of Shadow reboot series
Dracula appears in the post-credits scene of Castlevania: Lords of Shadow, a reboot of the series. The game follows Gabriel Belmont in the year 1047, but the epilogue reveals that in modern times Gabriel has become a vampire who identifies himself by saying "Eu sunt Dracul" in Romanian which can roughly translate to "I am the Dragon", "I am the Devil" or more popularly "I am Dracula". A secondary character, Zobek, finds Dracula hiding in a ruined church and tries to win his support against the acolytes of Satan. Before Gabriel disappears, Zobek tells him he will free him of his immortality if he helps him. It is explained through the game's two DLC Packages Reverie and Resurrection that after the defeat of the Lords of Shadow, a powerful demon they locked away called the Forgotten One had begun to break free. In order to enter the demon's prison dimension Gabriel, somewhat reluctantly allowed himself to be turned into a vampire followed by defeating the demon by absorbing its power and killing it in a single blow, completely sacrificing his humanity in the process.

In Mirror of Fate Gabriel returns as Dracula. His goal is to destroy the Brotherhood of Light in order to "remake" the world, as he believes the Brotherhood is evil and corrupt, as the Brotherhood manipulated him and allowed his wife to be killed when they could have prevented it. The brotherhood believed Gabriel was the chosen one, and would redeem mankind. The Brotherhood however knew of his descent into darkness so they raised his son, Trevor, kept from him in secret by Marie, as a member of the brotherhood in order to combat his father. Later Trevor would track down his father and attempt to avenge the death of his mother. He is impaled with his own Combat Cross. While dying, Trevor looks into the Mirror of Fate and sees what actually happened to Gabriel. Feeling sorry for him, he calls him his father. After looking into the mirror and learning the truth, Dracula panics and desperately attempts to revive him by giving him his own blood. After it does not seem to work, he puts Trevor in a coffin with the name Alucard as he never knew his son's true name. Dracula faces his son, now revived, and his grandson Simon. The end of the battle sees him disappear and Alucard says that's not how a vampire is supposed to die.

Gabriel returns as the main character in Castlevania: Lords of Shadow 2, where he refers to himself as the dragon, Dracul. Having abandoned his quest for vengeance, his goal is to put an end to his immortal existence.

In other media
Dracula appears as a recurring villain in the 1989 animated series Captain N: The Game Master. He is never referred to by name, only being addressed as "The Count". He is depicted as a lanky vampire in a yellow suit, later changed to black and blue in the show's third season. He seeks to terrorize the land of Castlevania, but is typically thwarted by Simon Belmont and the N Team. He has a strained relationship with his teenage son Alucard.

Dracula appears as a central character in the 2017 animated series Castlevania, voiced by Graham McTavish. The series adapts the events of Castlevania III: Dracula's Curse and reveals how Dracula first comes to meet his human wife, Lisa, and later how her unjust execution drives him to wage extinction on mankind. He is defeated at the end of season two by the combined efforts of Trevor Belmont, Sypha Belnades, and his son Alucard. Following his death, a number of individuals work to bring about Dracula's resurrection, including Death, who very nearly succeeds in resurrecting Dracula along with Lisa in the body of a Rebis. Though Trevor Belmont destroys both the Rebis and Death, through unexplained means, Dracula and Lisa return to life. The two set out to build a new life for themselves, contemplating moving to Whitby and resolving to not tell Alucard that they are alive for the time being, feeling that he needs closure.

Dracula appears as a boss in Super Smash Bros. Ultimate. He is encountered at the end of Classic Mode while playing as Simon, Richter, Luigi, Pac-Man, or the downloadable character Sephiroth. He also appears in the game's Adventure Mode: World of Light as the boss at the end of a Castlevania-themed map.

Reception
Dracula has become one of gaming's most popular villains based on his role on the franchise. He was listed as the third top villain of 2006 by Game Informer. He was also listed as the number 7 most recurring video game character who has died repeatedly and been resurrected. He is ranked third on EGM's Top Ten Badass Undead. GameDaily ranked him number sixteen in their "Top 25 Evil Masterminds of All Time" article, noting his persistence. His persistence resulted in him being ranked amongst the most persistent video game villains of all time by GameDaily. IGN listed him eight in their "Top 10 Most Memorable Villains" article, noting his grudge against the Belmonts and calling him "the Timex of villains." In a later article, they listed him as one of their favorite monsters in video gaming, stating a preference for the Castlevania representation of Dracula over others due to him having "a sense of fashion and style that few other versions possess." They would also list him as the 23rd best video game villain, calling him one of the most prolific video game villains ever. GamesRadar listed him first on their list of video game villains who never stay dead, stating that he has died more than any other video game villain ever and that like The Legend of Zelda antagonist Ganon, he never learns from his previous battles.

Journalists also commented on other characterizations of Dracula; Gabriel Belmont was listed as the fourth best video game hero who becomes evil by What Culture, citing the twist in how the character becomes Dracula. Similarly, GamesRadar listed Gabriel seventh in their "Top 7... fallen heroes that became awesome villains", mentioning how his personality changed in the franchise when becoming a vampire. For the animated Castlevania'' series, Anime News Network writer Zac Bertschy noted that one of its charms was that in contrast to many vampire series, Dracula was not the original real villain but instead the Church that killed his wife which causes Dracula to become evil. Bertschy also highly praised Scottish voice actor Graham McTavish for providing Dracula's voice as he "makes Dracula sound at once worldly and feral, aristocratic and satanic". The Verge agreed in regards to Dracula's characterization, finding him as a "sympathetic character as opposed to cartoonish villain with no real motivation beyond an unjustified drive to be evil". Dave Trumbore of Collider found Dracula's thirst of revenge understandable despite the chaos he makes. Dan Seitz at Uproxx agreed but felt the series sidelined the character.

In an interview regarding Dracula's humanization, Anime News Network told the Netflix staff, Dracula's humanization in the Netflix was better than the ones from other anti-villains like Magneto or Thanos which Executive Producer Adi Shankar found as an accomplishment.

References

Castlevania characters
Demon characters in video games
Dracula in written fiction
Fictional characters with immortality
Fictional counts and countesses
Fictional knights in video games
Fictional mass murderers
Fictional Romanian people
Fictional Swedish people
Konami antagonists
Male characters in video games
Male video game villains
Vampire characters in video games
Video game bosses
Video game characters introduced in 1986
Video game characters who can teleport
Video game characters with slowed ageing
Video game characters with superhuman strength
Video game characters who use magic
Video game mascots
Nobility characters in video games
Undead supervillains
Vampire supervillains